Lord of the Night is a 1927 German silent thriller film directed by Carl Heinz Wolff and starring Kurt Brenkendorf, Aud Egede-Nissen, and Rudolf Klein-Rogge.

The film's art direction was by Botho Hoefer and August Rinaldi.

Cast
In alphabetical order

References

Bibliography

External links

1927 films
Films of the Weimar Republic
Films directed by Carl Heinz Wolff
German silent feature films
German thriller films
German black-and-white films
1920s thriller films
Silent thriller films
1920s German films